Kochupurackal P. Mohanakumar (born 1955) is an Indian chemical biologist, neuroscientist and the director of Inter University Centre for Biomedical Research and Super Specialty Hospital, Kottayam. He is a former chief scientist at the Indian Institute of Chemical Biology and is known for his studies on Parkinson's disease and Huntington’s disease. The Department of Biotechnology of the Government of India awarded him the National Bioscience Award for Career Development, one of the highest Indian science awards, for his contributions to biosciences in 2000.

Biography 

Born in the south Indian state of Kerala in 1955, Mohanakumar did his undergraduate studies at the University of Kerala to earn a B.Sc. in zoology in 1976. His master's studies were at Aligarh Muslim University and after obtaining an M.Sc. in experimental biology and chemical neuroanatomy, in 1979, he enrolled at Saurashtra University for his doctoral studies to secure a PhD in neuropharmacology in 1985. His post-doctoral work and advanced training were at the National Institutes of Health, University of Göttingen, University of Essen, and the University of Virginia Medical Centre.

On his return to India, he joined the Indian Institute of Science Education and Research, Thiruvananthapuram where he served as a professor of biological sciences. Subsequently, he moved to the Indian Institute of Chemical Biology of the Council of Scientific and Industrial Research and was serving as the chief scientist at the Cell Biology and Physiology Division and as the head of the Project Monitoring and Evaluation Division, when he returned to his home state as the director of Inter University Centre for Biomedical Research and Super Specialty Hospital, Kottayam, a position he holds to date. He simultaneously serves as the convenor of the governing council of the institution. He has also served as a professor at the Academy of Scientific and Innovative Research.

Legacy 
Mohanakumar is known to have done notable work on neurodegenerative and neurodevelopmental disorders such as Parkinson's disease, Huntington's disease, autism and attention deficit hyperactivity disorder. It was under his leadership, an advanced clinical and experimental research laboratory on neurodegenerative diseases was established at the Indian Institute of Chemical Biology where research is carried out on the pathogenesis of Parkinson's disease. AT IICB, he headed a cybrids laboratory, reported to be one of the most advanced ones in India, and was involved in the study of neurodegenerative diseases, with special emphasis to the impact of mitochondria. His studies have been documented by way of a number of articles and ResearchGate, an online repository of scientific articles has listed 184 of them. Besides, he has edited work books for practicing neurobiologists and has contributed chapters to books edited by others. He has mentored several master's and doctoral scholars in their research and has delivered many invited speeches, which included the one delivered at Amrita BioQuest 2013.

Mohanakumar has been an elected member of the International Society for Neurochemistry and sits in its conference committee. He is a former president of the Society of Neurochemistry India and a former vice-president of the Indian Academy of Neurosciences. He has been associated with TWAS as well as UNESCO as a professor, with the Department of Biotechnology as a member of its Neurobiology Task Force, and is a member of the Chemical Biology Society. He sits in the editorial boards of journals such as Anatomy and Cell Biology, Neuroscience and Medicine, Journal of Neurochemistry, Neurochemistry International, and Neurochemical Research.

Awards and honors 
Mohanakumar, an elected member of Guha Research Conference, received the Young Scientist Award of the Indian Council of Medical Research in 1991. The Indian Academy of Neurosciences elected him as a fellow in 1999 and a year later, the Department of Biotechnology of the Government of India awarded him the National Bioscience Award for Career Development, one of the highest Indian science awards in 2000. The elected fellowship of the National Academy of Sciences, India was awarded to him 2008. He is also a recipient of the Uvnas Prize of the Indian Pharmacological Society for the best scientific publication and the Tulsabai Somani Educational Trust Award of Indian Academy of Neurosciences. The award orations delivered by him include Coln. R. N. Chopra Memorial Oration of Indian Pharmacological Society and Prof. B.K. Bachhawat Memorial Life Time Achievement (2019).

Selected bibliography

Chapters

Articles

See also 

 Melatonin
 Neurotoxicity

Notes

References

External links 
 
 
 
 

N-BIOS Prize recipients
Indian scientific authors
1955 births
Living people
Scientists from Kottayam
University of Kerala alumni
Academic staff of Mahatma Gandhi University, Kerala
Aligarh Muslim University alumni
National Institutes of Health people
University of Göttingen alumni
University of Virginia School of Medicine alumni
Indian biochemists
Indian neuroscientists
Fellows of The National Academy of Sciences, India